
Henry Chapman may refer to:

Politicians
 Henry Chapman (MP) (1556–1623), Member of Parliament for Newcastle-on-Tyne
 Henry Chapman (American politician) (1804–1891), Democratic politician in Pennsylvania
 Henry Samuel Chapman (1803–1881), Australian and New Zealand judge, colonial secretary, attorney-general, journalist and politician
 Henry Chapman (New South Wales politician) (1846–1930), one of the Members of the New South Wales Legislative Assembly, 1898–1901

Sportsmen
 Henry Chapman (cricketer) (1868–1942), Australian cricketer
 Henry Chapman (rower), 19th-century English rower

Others
Henry Cadwalader Chapman (1845–1909), American physician and naturalist
Henry N. Chapman, British physicist, 2015 recipient of the Gottfried Wilhelm Leibniz Prize

See also
Henry Chapman Mercer (1856–1930), American archaeologist